Gabriel Wüthrich (born 28 August 1981 in Echallens) is a Swiss footballer who last played as goalkeeper for FC Luzern in the Swiss Super League.

Career 
Wüthrich began his professional career at FC Biel-Bienne in 1999 before he moved to Neuchâtel Xamax in 2000. He battled for the Number 1 jersey for his first two seasons at Neuchâtel and eventually became the first-choice goalkeeper during the 2002/03 season. He left to join SR Delémont in 2003. However, the move did not seem to pay off as he was no-longer first-choice and was used in a rotation system, only playing once every few weeks. At the end of the season, he moved to FC St. Gallen in the Swiss Super League where he was back-up to Stefano Razzetti. FC Vaduz acquired his services in 2006 and he was the undisputed Number 1 during his first season but when Swiss Under-21 internationalist goalkeeper Yann Sommer joined the club on loan from FC Basel in 2007, his gloves were given up to the youngster. Sommer's loan was re-newed for another season in 2008, effectively ending Wüthrich's chances of making the first-team for another season. He left on 21 January 2009 FC Vaduz and joined on 28 January 2009 to FC Carl Zeiss Jena. After the season ended his contract, he left the club and signed later on 3 July 2009 with AC Lugano.

References

External links 
 

1981 births
Living people
Neuchâtel Xamax FCS players
SR Delémont players
FC St. Gallen players
FC Vaduz players
Swiss expatriate footballers
Swiss expatriate sportspeople in Liechtenstein
FC Carl Zeiss Jena players
Swiss expatriate sportspeople in Germany
Swiss Super League players
Swiss expatriates in Liechtenstein
FC Biel-Bienne players
Expatriate footballers in Liechtenstein
FC Lugano players
FC Luzern players
Association football goalkeepers
Swiss men's footballers
Expatriate footballers in Germany